William Johnson (born 1900) was an English footballer who played in the Football League for Hull City.

References

1900 births
Year of death missing
English footballers
Association football midfielders
English Football League players